This is a list of dams on the Brahmaputra River and hydro–infrastructure in the Brahmaputra River Basin which is a key constituent of the Ganges-Brahmaputra basin of Himalayan rivers. Brahmaputra originates near Mount Kailash, flows through Tibet where it is called Yarlung Tsangpo. It enters India in Arunachal Pradesh in Eastern Himalaya, and then enters Bangladesh where it is called Jamuna (not to be mistaken with Yamuna tributary of Ganges in India). It finally flows into the Bay of Bengal where it merges with the Ganges at Sunderban Delta. There are existing and planned dams on Brahmaputra in Tibet and India, but none in Bangladesh.

List of dams and other hydro–infrastructure 
Upstream to downstream

Map

See also 

 China's South–North Water Transfer Project
 Dams and reservoirs in China
 Geology of the Himalaya
 India's National Projects of the Ministry of Water Resources
 Indian Rivers Inter-link
 List of rivers in Bangladesh

References 

Bibliography

 
 

Brahmaputra River
Rivers-related lists
Brahmaputra
Brahmaputra
Proposed infrastructure in India
Ministry of Water Resources (India)